Lee Kum-jin (born 1 February 1965) is a South Korean basketball player. She competed in the women's tournament at the 1988 Summer Olympics.

References

External links
 
 FIBA Archive (1985 Junior Championship)

1965 births
Living people
South Korean women's basketball players
Olympic basketball players of South Korea
Basketball players at the 1988 Summer Olympics
Place of birth missing (living people)
Asian Games medalists in basketball
Basketball players at the 1986 Asian Games
Asian Games silver medalists for South Korea
Medalists at the 1986 Asian Games